Mabel's Wilful Way is a 1915 American short comedy film directed by Roscoe Arbuckle, starring Mabel Normand and Fatty Arbuckle.

Cast
 Mabel Normand as Mabel
 Roscoe 'Fatty' Arbuckle as Fatty
 Joe Bordeaux as Cop
 Glen Cavender
 Alice Davenport as Mabel's mother
 Edgar Kennedy as Fatty's pal
 Al St. John

See also
 Fatty Arbuckle filmography

References

External links

1915 films
Films directed by Roscoe Arbuckle
Films produced by Mack Sennett
1915 comedy films
1915 short films
American silent short films
American black-and-white films
Silent American comedy films
Keystone Studios films
American comedy short films
1910s American films